Make a Smellmitment is an advertising campaign created by Wieden+Kennedy for Old Spice in the United States. The campaign is preceded by "The Man Your Man Could Smell Like", which was a television advertising campaign by Wieden+Kennedy for Old Spice.

The "Make a Smellmitment" campaign retains much of the format from the previous campaign including its characters played by Isaiah Mustafa and Terry Crews. The content of the new campaign ads also consist of character monologues during long single shots while engaging in random activities and addressing the female audience. This advertising campaign markets Old Spice's "Bearglove" body wash and "Timber" bar soap. Mustafa's character (referred to as the "Old Spice Man") continues to target women despite marketing hygiene products for men as it was determined that women often buy household products for men. Crews also reprised his Old Spice character that targets the male audience.

The theme of the campaign focuses on the contrast between the smooth-talking monologues by Mustafa and screaming Crews interrupting each other as they advertise Old Spice Timber and Bearglove respectively. The commercials usually end with the two men each holding up their respective products side by side and pointing at them with Crews repeatedly yelling "Bearglove!" and Mustafa eventually saying "stop it".

Commercials
The initial commercial, titled "And So It Begins", lasts 1:02 minutes and was released on August 6, 2015. The commercial was created by Jason Bagley and Craig Allen of Wieden+Kennedy Portland and directed by Tom Kuntz. The commercial opens with a monologue by Isaiah Mustafa talking to the female audience about their men and embracing nature. In one shot, Mustafa moves from a bathroom to a forest to a jewelry store before moving to a canoe and being interrupted by Terry Crews who projectiles out of the water. The two men acknowledge appearing together in a commercial at the same time with the exchange "Guess who?", "It's you", "it's me, goodbye!" Crews stomps on the canoe, catapulting Mustafa out of the frame and screams "Don't use Timber, use Bearglove!" He continues screaming as he moves to a kitchen followed by the top of an erupting volcano and finally riding a motorcycle with five more of him and a tiger. To end the commercial, the motorcycle crashes into Mustafa's head as he says "stop it" and the camera closes in on the two products being held up Crews and Mustafa respectively side by side.

Three months after its release, the video on Old Spice's YouTube channel had received 11.6 million views and 53,000 likes on YouTube. On September 14, 2015, a complementary video titled "Make a Smellmitment: Behind The Scenes" was uploaded on Old Spice's YouTube channel featuring Crews and Mustafa discussing the new campaign.

On August 13, 2015, the second video of the campaign was uploaded to Old Spice's YouTube channel, titled "Interruption". Mustafa opened with a monologue about using Old Spice Swagger and Crews suddenly appeared to interrupt Mustafa and scream "Bearglove!". The commercial takes place in a fancy hall with Mustafa in the middle of the frame while multiple miniature images of Crews appear on the borders of the screen yelling "Bearglove!" The commercial ends with the familiar shot of Crews screaming "Bearglove!" and Mustafa saying "stop it". The two men hold up the Old Spice products side by side but this time Crews blocks the product Mustafa is holding up with his own product.

References 

Procter & Gamble
Advertising campaigns
American advertising slogans
2012 neologisms
Wieden+Kennedy